Alivak (
is a village in Rudpey-ye Jonubi Rural District, in the Central District of Sari County, Mazandaran Province, Iran. At the 2006 census, its population was 146, in 39 families.

References 

Populated places in Sari County